Winter Olympics, released in the United States as Winter Olympic Games, is the official video game of the XVII Olympic Winter Games in Lillehammer, Norway. All versions were published by U.S. Gold. It was released in North America in 1993 for the Amiga, Sega Genesis, and IBM PC compatibles. Ports to the Game Gear, Sega Genesis, Master System, and Super Nintendo Entertainment System followed. The game includes 10 winter sporting events. Players can represent countries from all over the world.

Gameplay
The player can train freely and compete in both full or mini (events selected by the player) Olympics. During competition, there are both medals and points tables. While in Olympic Gold points were awarded according to the medals table, in Winter Olympics they were given according to the best results, like decathlon. Doing so, it was perfectly possible to someone win the gold medal in short track, and get few more points than other skaters (even not finalists) that got better qualifying times. This scoring method also meant that someone who won gold medals in six or seven events might fall outside the top 10 if disqualified on the remaining three.

Events
Downhill
Giant Slalom
Super G
Slalom
Bobsled
Luge
Freestyle moguls (console versions only)
Ski jumping
Biathlon
Short track

Playable nations

Development
Major differences between versions stemmed from U.S. Gold's choice to use two companies developing different versions of the game separately. Additionally, Tiertex Design Studios wrote original code for each platform instead of porting. Amongst major differences, freestyle moguls are different on the 16-bit versions, and overall the Super NES version is much more unforgiving than the Genesis version, while the Master System version allows better control on alpine skiing events.

References

1993 video games
1994 Winter Olympics
Amiga games
DOS games
Game Boy games
Game Gear games
Master System games
Sega Genesis games
Super Nintendo Entertainment System games
Tiertex Design Studios games
U.S. Gold games
Video games set in 1994
Winter Olympic video games
Video games set in Norway
Video games developed in the United Kingdom